Anne Eustis Pepper Stewart (August 23, 1964 – November 12, 2017), known as Wendy Pepper, was a fashion designer who appeared on the first season of the reality television show Project Runway, which aired on Bravo from December 2004 through February 2005. She was also a contestant on the second season of Project Runway All Stars.

Early life and education

Pepper was born in Dayton, Ohio and lived in the town of Middleburg, Virginia. She graduated from The Madeira School in 1982 and then attended the University of Washington in Seattle, earning a degree in anthropology. While in college, Pepper studied abroad in Nepal and began to sew carpets with local Nepali women. This sparked her interest in design and working with fabric. She returned home and continued to learn more about textiles, fabric-painting, and quilting.

Project Runway

Runway clothes
Pepper won two of the challenges, with her design for the Banana Republic challenge and the Grammy dress for Nancy O'Dell. Her win in the Banana Republic challenge allowed her dress to be sold in select Banana Republic stores in the United States as well as online. Her dress sold out within three hours online and within two days in stores. As a result of her win in the Grammy dress challenge, O'Dell wore an altered version of Pepper's dress to the 2005 Grammy Awards, despite some expressed reservations from the judges. She also had noticeable failures, including her outfit for the Innovation challenge and her dress for the Envy challenge.

Fashion Week
As a finalist on Project Runway, Pepper was given the opportunity to display her "Thrill of the Hunt" fashion collection to a large audience at New York Fashion Week. She stated it was the second most important day of her life after the birth of her daughter. She came in third in the final competition, with Jay McCarroll winning.

Post-Runway activities
After Project Runway,  Pepper opened her own store in Middleburg, Virginia and continued to work with individual clients. Soon after the show ended, Wendy and her second husband (Robert Downing) separated. She told the New York Post that her experience on television had changed her and "it was difficult for my husband to sort of come along for that step."

Pepper continued to garner media attention. She appeared on the front page of The Georgetowner magazine in Washington, D.C., in the New York Post, The Washington Post, Loudoun Magazine, Middleburg Eccentric, and Factio. She took part in two other Bravo television shows: Celebrity Poker Showdown and Battle of the Network Reality Stars. She also took part in the interview process for contestants for season two of Project Runway. She had a brief cameo appearance in Bravo's Project Jay, an hour-long documentary on the winner of the first season of Project Runway.

Pepper showed her debut line, outside of Project Runway, on April 11, 2006 in Washington, D.C. Her ready-to-wear line was shown at the 2007 Cleveland Fashion Week in Cleveland, Ohio.

Death
Pepper died on November 12, 2017, aged 53, in Washington D.C. She died from complications of pneumonia after battling cancer for several months.

References

External links
 

1964 births
2017 deaths
American fashion designers
American women fashion designers
Burials at Oak Hill Cemetery (Washington, D.C.)
Deaths from cancer in Washington, D.C.
Deaths from pneumonia in Washington, D.C.
Madeira School alumni
People from Dayton, Ohio
People from Middleburg, Virginia
Project Runway (American series) participants